The name Vicky or Vicki has been used for six tropical cyclones worldwide.

In the Atlantic Ocean:
 Tropical Storm Vicky (2020), a tropical storm that formed in the eastern Atlantic, earliest twentieth named storm on record.

In the Australian region: 
 Cyclone Vicky (1972), affected northwestern Australia. 

In the Southern Pacific Ocean: 
 Cyclone Vicky (2001), never threatened land. 
 Cyclone Vicky (2020), brought heavy rainfall to the Samoan Islands. 

In the Western Pacific Ocean:
 Typhoon Vicki (1998) (T9807, 11W, Gading), affected the Philippines and made landfall in southern Japan.
 Tropical Storm Krovanh (2020) (T2023, 26W, Vicky), affected the Philippines, Malaysia, and Thailand.

Atlantic hurricane set index articles
Pacific typhoon set index articles
Australian region cyclone set index articles
South Pacific cyclone set index articles